Eucereon patrona is a moth of the subfamily Arctiinae. It was described by Schaus in 1896. It is found in Mexico and Venezuela.

References

patrona
Moths described in 1896